Hasari may refer to:
 Ḩaşārī, a village in Iran
 Hasari, a Marathi film of 1997

See also 
 Hazari (disambiguation)
 Khasari, a village in Himachal Pradesh, India